Passiria may refer to:

 The Val Passiria or Passeier Valley in north-eastern Italy
 The Passiria or Passeirer Gebirgsziege breed of goat from that valley
 The comune of  Moso in Passiria or Moos in Passeier in the valley
 The comune of  San Martino in Passiria or St. Martin in Passeier in the valley
 The comune of  San Leonardo in Passiria or St. Leonhard in Passeier in the valley